William Walker Foulkrod (November 22, 1846 – November 13, 1910) was a Republican member of the United States House of Representatives from Pennsylvania.

Biography
William Walker Foulkrod was born in Frankford, then a borough outside Philadelphia.  He was engaged in the wholesale dry-goods business and the manufacture of hosiery.  He was the first president of the Philadelphia Trades League, and interested in plans for the improvement of the Delaware River and Channel.

He graduated from Amherst College in 1869 with a bachelor's degree, and earned a master's degree from Cornell University in 1873.

He was married to Mary Clara Young (Sep. 22, 1846 in Philadelphia, Pennsylvania - Aug. 2, 1921 in Bar Harbor, Maine) from 1871 to his death in 1910.

Foulkrod was elected as a Republican to the Sixtieth and Sixty-first Congresses and served until his death in Frankford.  He had been an unsuccessful candidate for reelection just a few days before.  He was interred in Cedar Hill Cemetery in Philadelphia.

See also
List of United States Congress members who died in office (1900–49)

Sources

William W. Foulkrod at The Political Graveyard

1846 births
1910 deaths
Politicians from Philadelphia
Republican Party members of the United States House of Representatives from Pennsylvania
19th-century American politicians